The bonnacon (also called bonasus or bonacho) is a legendary creature described as a bull with inward-curving horns and a horse-like mane. Medieval bestiaries usually depict its fur as reddish-brown or black. Because its horns were useless for self-defense, the bonnacon was said to expel large amounts of caustic feces from its anus at its pursuers, burning them and thereby ensuring its escape.

Textual history
The first known description of the bonnacon comes from Pliny the Elder's Naturalis Historia:

The term is derived from Greek βόνᾱσος (bonasos), meaning "bison".

The popularity of the Naturalis Historia in the Middle Ages led to the bonnacon's inclusion in medieval bestiaries. In the tradition of the Physiologus, bestiaries often ascribed moral and scriptural lessons to the descriptions of animals, but the bonnacon gained no such symbolic meaning. Manuscript illustrations of the creature may have served as a source of humor, deriving as much from the reaction of the hunters as from the act of defecation.  The Aberdeen Bestiary describes the creature using similar language to Pliny, though the beast's location is moved from Paeonia to Asia:

The bonnacon is also mentioned in the life of Saint Martha in the Golden Legend, a 13th-century hagiographical work by Jacobus de Voragine. In the story, Saint Martha encounters and tames the Tarasque, a dragon-like legendary creature said to be the offspring of the biblical Leviathan and the bonnacon. In this account, the bonnacon (here: bonacho or onacho) is said to originate in Galatia.

References

External links

 Bonnacon at The Medieval Bestiary
 Image of the Bonnacon in the fifteenth-century English bestiary Copenhagen, GKS 1633 4º, f. 10r

Legendary mammals
Medieval European legendary creatures
Defecation